Rock Camp Motocross, formerly the Rocky Top Raceway, is a motocross track located in Lawrence County east of Coal Grove, Ohio. Construction started on the track in 2000 and the first race night was held May 22, 2004. In 2012 it was converted from a dirt raceway to a motocross track.

In 2010 the track hosted many special events, including the OVSCA (Ohio Valley Sprint Car Association) sanctioned "Summer Sizzler", and the Southern Ohio Flat Track Championships, featuring flat track motorcycles and quads, and Enduro races.

Classes
Rocky Top Raceway hosted four classes of racing weekly, Late Model, Modified, Bomber, and Mod-Lite. The track also host special events for the Sprint Car, Steel Block Late Model,4-Cylinder, and Enduro classes.
The premiere class ran at Rocky Top Raceway on a weekly basis is the Late Model class. These cars weigh around 2,300 pounds and can reach speeds of around 100 mph.

Track records
John McGuire holds the current Late Model track record, set in May 2006, with a 13.471.

Cole Duncan holds the current Sprint Car track record, set in July 2010, with a 12.080.

Randy Boggs holds the current Modified track record, set in August 2004, with a 15.280.

David Dunn holds the current Bomber track record, set in September 2006, with a 17.096.

Former Track Champions
2004
Late Model- Nick Bocook
Modified- Todd Robinson
Limited Late Model- John Melvin
Bomber- Conard Newman
2005
Late Model- Kenny Christy
Modified- David McWilliams
Bomber- Conard Newman
2006
Late Model- Nick Bocook
AMRA Modified- Todd Robinson
Bomber- Brett Carey
2007
Late Model- Rick Christian
Modified- Todd Robinson
Bomber- Wayne Hughes
2008
Late Model- Jackie Boggs
Modified- Todd Robinson
Bomber- Wayne Hughes
2009
Late Model- Jackie Boggs
Modified- Todd Robinson
Bomber- David Dunn
Mod-Lite- Chris Stone
2010
Late Model- Jason Perry
AMRA Modified- Craig Christian
Bomber- Bruce Gray, Jr.
Mod-Lite- Tony Sites

References

External links
 Rocky Top Raceway Official Site

Dirt oval race tracks in the United States
Buildings and structures in Lawrence County, Ohio
Motorsport venues in Ohio
Tourist attractions in Lawrence County, Ohio